Kosova Hora (until 1921 Kosová Hora) is a municipality and village in Příbram District in the Central Bohemian Region of the Czech Republic. It has about 1,400 inhabitants.

Administrative parts
Villages of Dobrohošť, Dohnalova Lhota, Janov, Lavičky, Lovčice, Přibýška and Vysoká are administrative parts of Kosova Hora.

Notable people
Friedrich Adler (1857–1938), Bohemian-Austrian jurist and writer

References

Villages in Příbram District